Bujas may refer to:

 Gašpar Bujas (1906-1963), Croatian poet, cultural and literary historian
 Josip Bujas (1930-1976), Croatian rower
 Leonardo Bujas (1904-1981), Croatian rower
 Ramiro Bujas (1879-1959), Croatian psychologist
 Šime Bujas (1927-2001), Croatian rower
 Zoran Bujas (1910-2004),  Croatian psychologist
 Željko Bujas (1928-1999), Croatian linguist, Anglicist, Americanist, lexicographer

Croatian surnames